Bruce Lee is a 2017 Indian Tamil-language action comedy film written and directed by Prasanth Pandiraj, starring G. V. Prakash Kumar and Kriti Kharbanda in the leading roles, while Bala Saravanan, Ramdoss, Rajendran, Mansoor Ali Khan, and Anandaraj play supporting roles. The film was produced by Kenaya Films. The music was composed by G. V. Prakash Kumar with cinematography by P. V. Shankar.

The film began production during July 2015 and was released on 17 March 2017.

Plot
Bruce Lee and his friend Abbas are good-for-nothing guys. An evil don named Ramdoss has a gang which assaults people with acid. Bruce Lee is in love with Saroja Devi Suprajit, a college student. Once, Ramdoss kills Minister Mansoor Ali Khan, and a photo of the killing is taken by Bruce Lee accidentally. With fear, Saroja Devi decides to give it to Mansoor's son but discovers that his son is involved in the killing, so she decides to give the evidence to her uncle, who is a lawyer. Unfortunately, her uncle also defends Ramdoss, and the commissioner asks Ramdoss to find who is shooting them. The next day, the girls are kidnapped by Ramdoss, and he demands the camera from Bruce Lee. Whether or not Bruce Lee saves Saroja forms the crux of the story.

Cast
G. V. Prakash Kumar as Bruce Lee (Gemini Ganesan)
Kriti Kharbanda as Saroja Devi Suprajit
Bala Saravanan as Abbas
Ramdoss as Godfather 
Rajendran as Mannikam, Abbas's uncle
Mansoor Ali Khan as Minister Mansoor Ali Khan
Anandaraj as Shanmugapandiyan
S R Pandiyan as Gangster
Aathma Patrick

Production
The project was first announced in June 2015, when G. V. Prakash Kumar had agreed to work with Prashanth Pandiraj on an action comedy film to be produced by Kenanya Films. The title of the film was changed in July 2015 from Baasha Engira Anthony to Bruce Lee, after the makers failed to acquire the relevant permission to use the title from the makers of Baashha (1995). During October 2015, the film had a brief legal tussle with the makers of the Telugu film of the same, Bruce Lee - The Fighter (2015), after they dubbed and released their film in Tamil as Bruce Lee 2. The team of the Tamil production, Bruce Lee, were unable to prevent the release of the Telugu version or its dubbed Tamil version.

Samantha and then Trisha were approached to play the leading female role, but their unavailability meant that Kriti Kharbanda, who also appeared in the Telugu Bruce Lee - The Fighter (2015), was signed on to make her debut in Tamil films. The team held a photoshoot in October 2015, with Kriti revealing that her and Prakash would portray college students. Production subsequently began later that month, with the makers targeting a release date in early 2016. Despite finishing the shoot in early 2016, the film was delayed to allow several of G. V. Prakash Kumar's other films have a theatrical release first.

Soundtrack

G. V. Prakash Kumar composed the songs, Arunraja Kamaraj, Mani kandan, Vairachandran, Gana Vinoth wrote the lyrics. Lahari Music released the album on 20 October 2016.

Release
Following multiple delays, Bruce Lee had a theatrical release on 17 March 2017. The satellite rights of the film were sold to Zee Tamil. The film was panned by the critics as well as audiences and ended up becoming a disaster at the box office. Vishal Menon of The Hindu wrote "you need a wicked sense of comedy and great actors to pull off this kind of screwball material, but, sadly, there’s not a single funny moment", while Thinkal Menon of The Times of India wrote "if spirits could watch films, the spirit of real Bruce Lee will turn into Kanchana and Chandramukhi after watching this absurd film". A reviewer from FirsPost stated "GV Prakash’s Bruce Lee would make the late legend turn in his grave" and that "the film, which was touted as a black comedy, is amateurish and has neither a story nor style". Further negative reviews were given to the film by The New Indian Express who stated it was a "comedy gone awry", while Sify.com noted that director "Prashanth Pandiraj has a half-cooked script that doesn’t know where to go after setting up its delicious premise". Baradwaj Rangan of Film Companion wrote "Bruce Lee is supposed to be a comedy. The key word supposed. It’s actually a tale of revenge."

Reception

Critical reception 
The film was panned by the critics.

References

External links
 

2017 films
2010s Tamil-language films
Films scored by G. V. Prakash Kumar
Indian action comedy films
2017 directorial debut films
2017 action comedy films